The Dream Merchant is a 2002 Dutch fantasy novel by Isabel Hoving.

Plot summary

Twelve-year-old Joshua Cope is contacted by a corporation called Gippart International one day late at night. Joshua and his friend, Bhasvar (Baz) Patel go to Gippart and meet Max Herbert, a talent scout. Josh is sent into a dreamworld to sell products. But dreams also come with nightmares...

Umaya, the collective dream of everyone at that point in time, is caught between dreams and reality. Josh, Baz and a fellow associate Teresa cannot get out of the dream-world, where time is running backwards due to a Gippart employee attempting to break into real time rather than dream-time. Along his adventure, Josh meets his dead twin sister Jericho, who has been attempting to get in contact with him for 350 years. But with Jericho comes Lucide, a guardian who makes sure that no one crosses the borders of life and death.

The members of this troop find themselves with powers that they cannot explain. Baz, the first to find his powers, can control dream time by listening to the rhythm and matching it, causing it to slow, stop, or even rewind. Teresa changes Umaya with words, influencing people and surroundings to her will, she is the group storyteller.  Josh is a thief and can change the very nature of things just by looking at them. However, they are trapped in umaya, the dream-world.

The four children must find Tembe at the end of time and fulfill Siparti's last promise to Temberi. They learn about each of Siparti's six kids and put together the clues that each of them hold.

After a harrowing ordeal, Josh, Jericho, Baz, Teresa, and Mervin Spratt manage to find their way to the edge of time itself, where the Tembe people live in a crumbling Fortress. The Tembe, descended from Temberi, have been trapped at the edge of time for over 1000 years. Luckily, the Tembe are friendly people, and show the associates how their Fortress is slowly being ripped away into the hurricane whom they have named Satura. Using the powers they gained in the journey, the children manage to find their way through the hurricane back into the real world.

Unfortunately, in the end, Jericho decides to return with Lucide and stay in Umaya.

Characters 
The following character descriptions appear at the back of the book:

Josh's Family (and Baz)

 Joshua (Josh) Michael Cope, 12 years old, son of Mo and Peter Cope
 Bhasvar (Baz) Patel, Josh's best friend, 12 years old
 Edwin - boyfriend of Josh's mother, Mo
 Liz - Edwin's daughter, 18 years old
 Mervin Spratt - Liz's Boyfriend, enemy of Josh and associate of Garnet
 Jericho Cope, 'dead' twin sister of Joshua, comeback child

Gippart International

 Marmeduke Fawcett - Secretary of Youth Affairs, Dispatch Board
 Max Herbert - Talent Scout, Dispatch Board
 Garnet Gippart, Tal Sow Fall, Miriane Comptesso and Oublassi - Board members, Disbatch Board, Project Umaya
 Ouahabi - Senior in employ of the Dispatch Board
 Moussa - Chief of Associates, 17 years old
 Teresa Okwoma - Gippart Associate, friend of Josh and Baz, 14 years old
 Ida Gippart - Vice President

Siparti

 Siparti - (or Kide) born 950, in Zaam
 Mono - the beloved, is the eldest son, born in 990; his city is Ixilis
 Brax - the noble one, is the eldest daughter, born in 993; the Takraas highlands are her territory
 Kauri - the missionary, is the middle daughter, born in 995; her territory is the coastline around Tsumir and its oceans
 Beez - the lethal one, is the middle son, born in 996; the city of Bat Zavinam has been his since the year 1347
 Kat - the youngest daughter, born in Arrar on January 1, 1000
 Gip - the youngest son, born in Arrar on January 1, 1000

Temberi

 Temberi - (or Awè) born in 948 in Zaam
 Bazamène - whose eldest son is Tibid
 Lim the Singer - whose eldest son is Mim
 Imen
 Mersele
 Pann

Literary significance & criticism
"There is no doubt about it, this is better than Harry Potter. It is compelling, exciting, wonderfully complicated, realistic, credible, heartwarming and is loaded with fantasy and humour. A sensational debut by a born narrator." de Volkskrant
"Out of the blue there appears one of these worldbooks, in which young readers can lose themselves." De Gelderlander
"Generously long-drawn-out epic by a new master narrator... In cinematic scenes Hoving recalls magic and intriguing worlds like Tolkien has done it before... No Harry Potter can beat that!" De Morgen 
"An epic fantasy, original and fresh" Michael Morpurgo

Awards and nominations
 Golden Kiss 2003

External links
 http://www.walkerbooks.co.uk/The-Dream-Merchant-Hardback-0744583357 Walker Books
 http://www.walkerbooks.co.uk/Isabel-Hoving Isabel Hoving

Footnotes

References

2002 fantasy novels
21st-century Dutch novels
Dutch-language novels